Glencoe is a census-designated place in southern Richland Township, Belmont County, Ohio, United States. As of the 2010 census it had a population of 310. It has a post office with the ZIP code 43928.

Glencoe is part of the Wheeling, WV-OH Metropolitan Statistical Area.

History
Glencoe was laid out in 1855 when the Baltimore & Ohio Railroad was extended to that point. Some say the community was named after the Coe family, who settled in a nearby glen, while others believe the name is a transfer from Glencoe, Scotland. A post office called Glencoe has been in operation since 1855.

References

External links
 Glencoe Cemetery in Find a Grave

Census-designated places in Belmont County, Ohio
1855 establishments in Ohio
Populated places established in 1855